Predrag Stanković (Serbian Cyrillic: Пpeдpaг Cтaнкoвић; born 17 September 1968 in Leskovac, Jablanica District) is a Serbian retired footballer who played as a central defender.

Football career
In his country, Stanković played for OFK Beograd, FK Zemun and Red Star Belgrade. At age 28, in January 1997, he moved abroad, signing with Spanish side Hércules CF.

On 5 January, Stanković made his La Liga debut in a home match against Sporting de Gijón (1–1), and managed to appear regularly until the end of the season as his team was eventually relegated. He shared teams with compatriot Josip Višnjić during his spell in Alicante.

In 1999, Stanković and Hércules suffered another relegation, now to the third division. He then signed with CP Mérida but the club folded soon after, immerse in a deep financial crisis, and the player retired at 32.

Drug scandal
After retiring, Stanković settled in Spain and became a player's agent. In February 2009 he, alongside Rayo Vallecano footballer Carlos de la Vega, was arrested in connection with an anti-drug operation in Madrid. He was condemned to nine years in 2014 (confirmation in 2015) alongside fellow footballer Txutxi – as five other people received sentences that ranged from four to 12 years, with de la Vega being one of two persons acquitted – for smuggling 950 kg of cocaine into the country.

References

External links

1968 births
Living people
Sportspeople from Leskovac
Yugoslav footballers
Serbian footballers
Association football defenders
Yugoslav First League players
OFK Beograd players
FK Zemun players
Red Star Belgrade footballers
La Liga players
Segunda División players
Segunda División B players
Hércules CF players
CP Mérida footballers
Serbian expatriate footballers
Expatriate footballers in Spain
Serbian expatriate sportspeople in Spain
People convicted of drug offenses